Extrapolation is the debut album by English jazz guitarist John McLaughlin. It was recorded at Advision Studios in January 1969 and first released later in the year by Marmalade Records in the UK. The label was founded by producer Giorgio Gomelsky and distributed by Polydor Records. Re-issues of the album are on the Polydor label.

In 1972 the album was issued for the first time in the United States following McLaughlin's success as the leader of Mahavishnu Orchestra. It reached No. 152 on the Billboard 200 album chart. 

"Binky's Beam" is dedicated to former jazz bass player Binky McKenzie.

Track listing

Personnel
Musicians:
 John McLaughlin – electric and acoustic guitar
 John Surman – baritone and soprano saxophones
 Brian Odgers – double bass (incorrectly named "Odges" on the liner notes)
 Tony Oxley – drums
Technical:
 Giorgio Gomelsky – producer
 Eddy Offord – engineer (listed as "Eddie Offord")

References

External links
 Review on jazz.com

1969 debut albums
Albums produced by Giorgio Gomelsky
John McLaughlin (musician) albums
Polydor Records albums
Marmalade Records albums